McGriggs is a surname. Notable people with the surname include:

Lamar McGriggs (born 1968), American football player
Milton McGriggs, American football player